Helyett was a French professional cycling team that existed from 1932 to 1961.

References

External links

Cycling teams based in France
Defunct cycling teams based in France
1932 establishments in France
1961 disestablishments in France
Cycling teams established in 1932
Cycling teams disestablished in 1961